Hans Steinhardt (29 June 1905 – 1 December 1981) was a German hurdler. He competed in the men's 110 metres hurdles at the 1928 Summer Olympics.

References

1905 births
1981 deaths
Athletes (track and field) at the 1928 Summer Olympics
German male hurdlers
Olympic athletes of Germany
Place of birth missing